Ofer Eshed (November 24, 1942-June 23, 2007) was an Israeli basketball player and coach. He played and coached in the Israeli Basketball Premier League, and was third in the league in career scoring. He also played for and was Captain of the Israel national basketball team.

Biography
Eshed played for Hapoel Holon, Hapoel Tel Aviv, and Beitar Tel Aviv in 17 seasons from 1958 to 1978. In his highest-scoring season, in 1970, he average 29.9 points per game. He scored 7,758 career points, third-most in the history of the Israeli Basketball Premier League.

He played for and was Captain of the Israel national basketball team. Eshed played in the 1964 FIBA European Olympic Qualifying Tournament for Men, and the 1968 FIBA European Olympic Qualifying Tournament for Men.

Eshed was an Assistant Coach for Hapoel Tel Aviv from 1995-97.

References

External links
כדורסלן העבר עופר אשד הלך לעולמו, Walla.

1942 births
2007 deaths
Israeli men's basketball players
Hapoel Holon players
Hapoel Tel Aviv B.C. players
Israeli Basketball Premier League players
Asian Games medalists in basketball
Basketball players at the 1966 Asian Games
Asian Games gold medalists for Israel
Medalists at the 1966 Asian Games